The Nasiriyya is a Sufi order founded by Sidi  Mohammed ibn Nasir al-Drawi (1603–1674) whose centre was Tamegroute.

See also
 Darqawa (Sufism)

References

Bibliography
 Ph.D. Thesis: "Between God and men : the Nasiriyya and economic life in Morocco, 1640-1830" by David Gutelius. Johns Hopkins University, 2001.
 Article: The path is easy and the benefits large: The Nasiriyya, social networks and economic change in Morocco, 1640–1830. The Journal of African History, Gutelius, David P.V.,  01-Jan-02 
 Book chapter: "Sufi networks and the Social Contexts for Scholarship in Morocco and the Northern Sahara, 1660-1830" by David Gutelius.  In "The Transmission of Learning in Islamic Africa ed. Scott Reese.  Leiden: Brill Academic Press, 2004.
 Agriculture, Sufism and the State in Tenth/Sixteenth-Century Morocco, by Francisco Rodriguez-Manas, Bulletin of the School of Oriental and African Studies, University of London, Vol. 59, No. 3 (1996), pp. 450–471 
 The Nasiri supplication 
 Example of a manuscript (from Timbouctou) in the library of the Nasiryya 
 Dalil Makhtutat Dar al Kutub al Nasiriya, 1985 (Catalog of the Nasiri zawiya in Tamagrut), (ed. Keta books)

Sufi orders
Moroccan Sufi orders